

F. A. Brockhaus AG is a German book publishing firm founded by Friedrich Arnold Brockhaus. It is best known for its eponymous encyclopedia.

History 
Friedrich Arnold Brockhaus founded his publishing house in 1805 in Amsterdam, then part of the Batavian Republic. In 1808, he acquired the rights to the Conversations-Lexikon, whose later editions came to be known as the Great Brockhaus and the Brockhaus Encyclopedia. He relocated it to Altenburg in Saxe-Gotha-Altenburg in 1811 and then to Leipzig in Saxony in 1817. Its Leipzig operations were nationalized by East Germany following its 1953 formation. Its East German successor published reference works and geographical and ethnographic texts. Its West German successor established itself in Wiesbaden. Following German reunification, corporate headquarters were moved to Munich.

Footnotes

Bibliography

External links 
  

Book publishing companies of Germany
German encyclopedias
Publishing companies established in 1805